Dariapur Union is a union of Sakhipur Upazila in Tangail District, Bangladesh. It was established in 2011.

See also
 Union Councils of Tangail District

References

Populated places in Dhaka Division
Populated places in Tangail District
Unions of Sakhipur Upazila